Mongala District was a district of the Belgian Congo and the Democratic Republic of the Congo. It went through various changes in extent. It covered roughly the same area as the present Mongala province and most of Nord-Ubangi province.

Location

In 1933 the original four provinces of the Belgian Congo were reorganized into six provinces, named after their capitals, and the central government assumed more control.
Équateur Province became Coquilhatville.
The number of districts was reduced to 15.
Ubangi District and Bangala District were combined to form Congo-Ubangi District, the northern part of Coquilhatville Province.
Coquilhatville Province was renamed Équateur Province in 1947.

By 1954 Congo-Ubangi District had been divided into Ubangi District to the west and Mongala District to the east.
A 1955-1957 map shows Mongala District bordered by French territories to the north, Bas-Uele District to the east, Stanleyville District to the southeast, Tshuapa District to the south, Équateur District to the southwest and Ubangi District to the west.
It roughly corresponded to the present Mongala Province and the east and central parts of the present Nord-Ubangi Province.

Post-independence

On 14 August 1962 Cuvette Centrale Province and Ubangi Province were separated from Équateur Province, and on 5 February 1963 the remainder became Moyen-Congo Province.
These three provinces were combined into a new Équateur Province on 25 April 1966.
On 11 July 2015 Équateur was split into the present provinces of Équateur, Mongala, Nord-Ubangi, Sud-Ubangi and Tshuapa.

Maps

See also

Districts of the Belgian Congo
Districts of the Democratic Republic of the Congo

References

Sources

 / http://www.kaowarsom.be/en/online_maps

Districts of the Belgian Congo
Districts of Équateur (former province)